The Spain national handball team is governed by the Royal Spanish Handball Federation. Spain is one of the most successful handball teams in the world, having won two World Championships. They are also the only team, besides Sweden, to have successfully defended a European Championship title, having won in 2018 and 2020. As of January 2021, they are reigning double defending European Champions.

Honours

Competitive record
 Champions   Runners-up   Third place   Fourth place

Olympic Games

World Championship

European Championship

Team

Current squad
Squad for the 2023 World Men's Handball Championship.

Head coach: Jordi Ribera

Individual records
Bold denotes players still playing international handball.

Most capped players

Top scorers

References

External links

IHF profile

Handball in Spain
Men's national handball teams
H